"Dime Si Recuerdas" (English: Tell Me If You Remember) is a song recorded by Puerto Rican reggaetón recording artist Ivy Queen, for the platinum edition of her sixth studio album, Sentimiento (2007). It was composed by Queen and Norgie Noriega and produced by Luny Tunes and Noriega. Lyrically the song is asking someone if they remember the good memories they shared and the time they spent together.

The song is a tropical bachata ballad. Ivy Queen performed the song as a part of the setlist of her 2008 World Tour which was held from the José Miguel Agrelot Coliseum known as the Coliseum of Puerto Rico in San Juan, Puerto Rico. This is the first of two occurrences where a song other than a single released by Ivy Queen has been able to obtain chart success, managing to debut and peak at #35 on the Latin Rhythm Airplay chart; the other being Acércate in 2010.

Background
Ivy Queen began working on her sixth studio album in 2006 after divorcing from her husband of nine years. Wanting to go in a different direction than her previous albums, she said she wanted to give a 180-degree turn to what people think of reggaetón. She explained "Many think reggaetón is just nice rhythms to dance to. And they forget there are song-writers and composers, who, like everyone else, also suffer and aspire in love". She wanted the album to be about that. She said "Love is what makes us write things, what keeps us alive. If we did not have love, we would have nothing". After the commercial success of the album, which was certified Platinum by the United States Recording Industry Association of America (RIAA), a platinum edition and substantial live album was distributed by Univision and Machete in late-2007 and 2008 respectively. Of the seven new tracks featured on the platinum edition was "Dime Si Recuerdas" while a rerecording of the Top 10 hit "Que Lloren" also appears.

Composition
It was produced by the Dominican-born reggaeton production duo Luny Tunes and the Puerto Rican-born reggaeton producer Noriega. Luny Tunes has worked with Ivy Queen in the past producing much of her early work, including "Te He Querido, Te He Llorado" which appeared on Luny Tunes' second compilation album Mas Flow 2 (2005).

As well as Noriega, who has produced songs from Queen such as "Quiero Saber" in 2002 and "Amiga No Pienses" which appeared on Noriega's second compilation album Contra La Corriente (2004). "Dime Si Recuerdas" is a bachata song. A musical bolero-based genre that originated in the Dominican Republic and spread to parts of the world including Latin America while becoming popular in places such as Puerto Rico.

Charts
"Dime Si Recuerdas" was featured on the platinum edition of the album, as the fourth track. It managed to debut and peak at #35 on the Latin Rhythm Airplay chart for the week of December 22, 2007.

Credits and personnel

Album Version
Dime Si Recuerdas  4:13  — (IQ Publishing/BMI)
Interpreters/Composers: Ivy Queen/Norgie Noriega
Executive Production: Ivy Queen
Musical Production: Luny Tunes/Noriega
Mastering: Esteban Piñero
Art Direction: Holly Chen
Photography: Garg Bonderenko
Makeup and Hair: Ariel Hernández

Live Version
Mixing Engineer: Arnaldo Santo "Naldo" & Miguel Pequero
Musical Director: Miguel Márquez "Escobar"
Bass: José Aponte
Guitar: Juan C. Rodríguez
Keyboards: Andres Arroyo "Zoprano"
Drums: Antonio Alonso "Papito"
Percussion: Omar Soto "Pooh"
Güira: Lionel Rodríguez "Leo"
Chorus 1: Julio Cartagena "Corbata"
Chorus 2: Zulma Oviedo
Chorus 3: Orlando Rosario "Orlandito"
DJ: David Montañez "DJ Davey"
Sound: Comco Audio
Sound Engineer Monitors: Ryan Vargas
Sound Engineer FOH: Manuel Comulada

References

2007 songs
Ivy Queen songs
Bachata songs
Spanish-language songs
Songs written by Ivy Queen
Songs written by Noriega (producer)
Song recordings produced by Luny Tunes
Univision Music Group singles